The Australian Academy of Science was founded in 1954 by a group of distinguished Australians, including Australian Fellows of the Royal Society of London. The first president was Sir Mark Oliphant. The academy is modelled after the Royal Society and operates under a Royal Charter; as such, it is an independent body, but it has government endorsement. The Academy Secretariat is in Canberra, at the Shine Dome.

The objectives of the academy are to promote science and science education through a wide range of activities. It has defined four major program areas:
 Recognition of outstanding contributions to science
 Education and public awareness
 Science policy
 International relations

The academy also runs the 22 National Committees for Science which provide a forum to discuss issues relevant to all the scientific disciplines in Australia.

Origins
The Australian National Research Council (ANRC) was established in 1919 for the purpose of representing Australia on the International Research Council. The Council ceased to exist in 1954, replaced by the Australian Academy of Science.

The Shine Dome

The Shine Dome (previously known as Becker House) is a well-known Canberra landmark, notable for its unusual structure, and colloquially referred to as "The Martian Embassy", an allusion to its shape and the fact that as the capital of Australia, Canberra is the home of foreign embassies. It was designed by architect Sir Roy Grounds, of Grounds, Romberg and Boyd. When completed in 1959 its 45.75-metre-diameter dome was the largest in Australia.

On 1 December 1956, the academy's building design committee met in Adelaide to look over plans submitted by six architects. The plan accepted involved a 710-tonne reinforced concrete dome, which had to be supported by 16 thin supports. The concrete is approximately 60 cm thick at the base supports, and 10 cm at the top. The dome supports itself, with no internal wall holding it up. It cost £200,000 to build. The foundation stone, laid on 2 May 1958 by Prime Minister of Australia, Robert Menzies, was originally part of the pier of the Great Melbourne Telescope constructed in 1869 under the supervision of the Royal Society and transferred to Mount Stromlo Observatory in the 1940s.

The building was named Becker House, for benefactor and Fellow of the Academy Sir Jack Ellerton Becker, in 1962. In 2000, it was renamed in honour of Fellow John Shine, who donated one million dollars to renovate the dome.

The interior contains three floors: on the ground level, the main auditorium, the Ian Wark Theatre, seats 156 people, the Jaeger Room for functions and meetings, the Becker Council Meeting Room and offices; the upper level includes a gallery to the theatre and the Adolf Basser Library; and the basement houses storage for historical records of science in Australia.

In 2016, the dome appeared in the television documentary series about Australian modernist architecture Streets of Your Town presented by Tim Ross.

On 20 January 2020 the Dome was seriously damaged by a hailstorm with smashed skylights and denting of the copper roof surface.

Education
Science education is a main commitment of Australian Academy of Science. Current activities include following projects:

 Primary Connections
 Science by Doing
 Nova: science for curious minds
 reSolve: Mathematics by Inquiry
 Science booklets
 Brain Box

Fellows

The Fellowship of the Australian Academy of Science is made up of around 500 leading Australian scientists. Scientists judged by their peers to have made an exceptional contribution to knowledge in their field may be elected to Fellowship of the academy. Twenty new Fellows may be elected every year.

No more than two Fellows may be elected every three years on the basis of distinguished contributions to science by means other than personal research. A small number of distinguished foreign scientists with substantial connections to Australian science are elected as Corresponding Members.

Fellows are denoted by the letters FAA (Fellow of the Australian Academy of Science) after their name.

Foundation Fellows
When the academy was founded in 1954 there were 24 members, known as the Foundation Fellows:

Presidents
Source:

 Sir Mark Oliphant (1954–1957)
 Sir John Eccles (1957–1961)
 Sir Thomas Cherry (1961–1964)
 Sir Frank Macfarlane Burnet (1965–69)
 Dr David Martyn (1969–1970)
 Professor Dorothy Hill (1970)
 Sir Rutherford Robertson (1970–1974)
 Sir Geoffrey Badger (1974–1978)
 Dr Lloyd Evans (1978–1982)
 Professor Arthur Birch (1982–1986)
 Professor David Curtis (1986–1990)
 Professor David Craig (1990–1994)
 Sir Gustav Nossal (1994–1998)
 Professor Brian Anderson (1998–2002)
 Dr Jim Peacock (2002–2006)
 Professor Kurt Lambeck (2006–2010)
 Professor Suzanne Cory (2010–2014)
 Professor Andrew Holmes (2014–2018)
 Professor John Shine (2018–2022)
 Professor Chennupati Jagadish (2022–)

Awards
Early career awards:
 Anton Hales Medal to recognise distinguished research in the Earth sciences; 
 Dorothy Hill Medal to recognise research in the Earth sciences by female researchers; 
 Fenner Medal, to recognise distinguished research in biology;
 Gottschalk Medal, to recognise outstanding research in the medical sciences;
 John Booker Medal, to recognise outstanding research in the sciences that underpin engineering;
 Le Fèvre Medal, to recognise outstanding basic research in chemistry;
 Pawsey Medal, to recognise outstanding research in physics;
 Ruth Stephens Gani Medal, to recognise distinguished research in human genetics, including clinical, molecular, population and epidemiological genetics and cytogenetics.
 Moran Medal to recognise outstanding research in one or more of the fields of applied probability, biometrics, mathematical genetics, psychometrics and statistics (awarded every two years).

Mid career awards:
 Gustav Nossal Medal, to health researchers; 
 Jacques Miller Medal, to experimental biomedicine researchers;  
 Nancy Millis Medal for Women in Science.

Career awards recognising lifelong achievement:
 David Craig Medal and Lecture, for researchers in chemistry; 
 Haddon King Medal, for researchers in earth science;
 Hannan Medal, for researchers in mathematics;
 Ian Wark Medal and Lecture;
 Jaeger Medal, for researchers in earth science;
 Thomas Ranken Lyle Medal, for researchers in mathematics or physics;
 Macfarlane Burnet Medal and Lecture, for research in the biological sciences;
 Matthew Flinders Medal and Lecture, for researchers in physical science;
 Mawson Lecture and Medal, for researchers in earth science;
 Ruby Payne-Scott Medal and Lecture, for women in science;
 Suzanne Cory Medal, for research in the biological sciences.

Other awards include:
 Academy Medal for outstanding contributions to science by means other than through scientific research;
 Lloyd Rees Lecture, for lectures in chemical physics;
 Selby Fellowship awarded to distinguished overseas scientists to visit Australia for public lecture/seminar tours.

Other learned Academies
There are three other learned Academies in Australia, those of Humanities (Australian Academy of the Humanities), Social Science (Academy of the Social Sciences in Australia) and Technological Sciences and Engineering (Australian Academy of Technological Sciences and Engineering). The four Academies cooperate through the Australian Council of Learned Academies, formed in 2010.

Arms

See also 

 List of Australian organisations with royal patronage

References

External links

 Australian Academy of Science
 Australian Academy of Science Building
 Taxonomy Australia, a branch of the Australian Academy of Science

1954 establishments in Australia
Australian National Academies
Australian National Heritage List
Organisations based in Canberra
Science
National academies of sciences
Organisations based in Australia with royal patronage
Scientific organizations established in 1954
Scientific organisations based in Australia
Members of the International Council for Science
Buildings and structures awarded the Sir John Sulman Medal
Members of the International Science Council
Round buildings in Australia